Izzeldin 'Izo' Elhabib (born 14 March 1987 in El-Obeid, Sudan) is a Sudanese footballer who last competed for Laos F.C. of the United Football League. He has a brother named Badreldin who's preferred position is central defender.

Early life

Born in El-Obeid, Sudan, Elhabib grew up in Riyadh, Saudi Arabia, starting football aged 3.

Career in the Philippines

A student of La Salle University, Elhabib played varsity football while studying there.

Won the United Football League Top Goalscorer award with Kaya.

Bagging 8 goals, he was pronounced top scorer of the 2010 UFL Cup.

Seen as a threat to other teams in the 2013 Singapore Cup and known for taking advantage of disorganized defence, Elhabib scored 10 goals in 14 matches for Global by mid-season 2013, followed by a hat-trick versus Forza F.C. in the United Football League Cup that year. At Global, the forward wore the number 10 jersey, a number that usually betokens the team's star player. Forming a good relationship with Global chairman Dan Palami, he thanked the Cebu-based club for their munificence towards him and recorded 13 goals in the 2011 United Football League, two seasons before 2013.

In 2012, Elhabib was considering giving up his Sudanese citizenship to get a Filipino passport in order to be naturalized and represent the Philippines internationally.

Missed out on the 2013 AFC President's Cup on account of being dropped from Global's squad for the competition.

In 2016, he signed for Laos F.C.

Personal life

The former Kaya player favors Brazilian footballer Ronaldo as his favorite player.

References

Sudanese footballers
Sudan international footballers
Living people
1987 births
Sudanese expatriate footballers
Expatriate footballers in the Philippines
Association football forwards
Association football wingers
Global Makati F.C. players
Kaya F.C. players